Ōyama Station (大山駅) is the name of multiple train stations in Japan:

 Ōyama Station (Kagoshima) 
 Ōyama Station (Tokyo)

See also
 Oyama Station